Tikari Assembly constituency is an assembly constituency for Bihar Legislative Assembly (Bihar Vidhansabha) in Gaya district of Bihar, India. It comes under Aurangabad (Bihar Lok Sabha constituency). This assembly was established in 2010 and before this assembly was named Konch Assembly constituency.

Members of Legislative Assembly

Election results

2020

References

External links
 

Assembly constituencies of Bihar